The common skate (Dipturus batis), also known as the blue skate, is the largest skate in the world, attaining a length of up to . Historically, it was one of the most abundant skates in the northeast Atlantic Ocean and the Mediterranean Sea. Despite its name, today it appears to be absent from much of this range. Where previously abundant, fisheries directly targeted this skate and elsewhere it is caught incidentally as bycatch. The species was uplisted to critically endangered on the IUCN Red List in 2006 and it is protected within the EU.

Research published in 2009 and 2010 showed that the species should be split into two, the smaller southern D. cf. flossada (blue skate), and the larger northern D. cf. intermedius (flapper skate). Under this taxonomic arrangement, the name D. batis is discarded. Alternatively, the scientific name D. batis (with flossada as a synonym) is retained for the blue skate and D. intermedius for the flapper skate.

Description
Overall shape features a pointed snout and rhombic shape, with a row of spines or thorns along the tail. The top surface is generally coloured olive-grey to brown, often with a pattern of spots, and the underside is lighter blue-grey. It can be confused with several other skates in its range, such as D. nidarosiensis, D. oxyrinchus, and Rostroraja alba.

Range, habitat, and ecology
The common skate is native to the northeast Atlantic. It is a bottom dwelling species mainly found at depths of 100-200m, but it can occur as shallow as 30m and as deepth as 1000m. Now, their population and range are severely depleted and fragmented, with disappearances being reported on several places. This species is found in northeastern Atlantic from Norway and Iceland to Senegal. Its presence in the Mediterranean Sea is questionable since earlier records could concern D. intermedius recently considered as a distinct species.

Growth and reproduction
The common skate can reach an estimated age of 50–100 years and  maturity is reached when about 11 years old. The size where they reach maturity depend on sex and population. The sex ratio is 1:1, but this can vary depending on geography and season. Once they have reached sexual maturity, they reproduce only every other year. They mate in the spring, and during the summer, females lay about 40 egg cases in sandy or muddy flats. The eggs develop for 2–5 months before hatching.

Egg case
They are covered in close-felted fibers and often wash up on the shore.

Egg case hunts have been done throughout the general distribution of the common skate. In the British Isles, egg cases were found only in northern Scotland and the north of Ireland. In the 19th and 20th centuries, egg cases were seen along the entire British coastline in high numbers, but now they are found only in a few areas.

Diet
Like other skates, the common skate is a bottom feeder. Its diet consists of crustaceans, clams, oysters, snails, bristle worms, cephalopods, and small to medium-sized fish (such as sand eel, flatfish, monkfish, catsharks, spurdog, and other skates). The size of the individual can affect its diet. Larger ones eat larger things like fish. The bigger the skate is, the more food will be needed to sustain its large body size. The activity level determines how much it eats; the more active it is, the more it eats.  The common skate does not feed only on creatures at the bottom of the ocean, as some do ascend to feed on mackerel, herring, and other pelagic fish, which are caught by rapidly moving up from the seabed to grab the prey.

Threatened status
The common skate is listed as a critically endangered species by the IUCN and it is threatened both in the Atlantic Ocean and Mediterranean Sea. The common skate's population has drastically decreased because of overfishing and it likely will disappear entirely unless more is done to preserve it.  It has both been targeted directly and caught incidentally as bycatch. Due to the profitability of trawl fishing,  bycatch likely will remain a serious problem for the common skate. The species is extirpated in the Baltic Sea. Remaining strongholds where it remains locally common are off western Scotland and in the Celtic Sea. A stronghold along the coast of Norway has been suggested, but recent studies indicate the species is rare there and many previous records are the result of misidentifications of other skates.

Because the common skate is long-lived and slow to mature, it may be slow to repopulate, but experience with the related barndoor skate (D. laevis) of the northwest Atlantic indicates that a population recovery may be possible in a relatively short time. The common skate is strictly protected within the EU, making it illegal for commercial fishers to actively fish for it or keep it if accidentally landed. Like other elasmobranchs, it is believed to have a good chance of surviving if released after being caught.

Taxonomy
Under this taxonomic arrangement, the name D. batis is discarded. Alternatively, the scientific name D. batis (with flossada as a  synonym) is retained for the blue skate and D. intermedius for the flapper skate. A formal request of preserving the name D. batis (with flossada as a synonym) for the blue skate has been submitted to the International Commission on Zoological Nomenclature, but as of 2017 a decision is still pending.

Based on molecular phylogenetics, D. cf. intermedius is very close to D. oxyrinchus, while the relationship to D. cf. flossada is more distant.

D. cf. intermedius has dark olive-green eyes and the blotch on each wing consists of a group of pale spots. D. cf. flossada has pale yellow eyes, and the blotch on each wing is relatively large, roughly round, dark and with a pale ring around it. Additional differences between the two are found in the thorns on their tails and other morphometric features. Both are found around the British Isles, and their ranges broadly overlap in the seas around this archipelago, but D. cf. intermedius is the most frequent species in the northern half (off Scotland and Northern Ireland), and D. cf. flossada is the most frequent in the southwest (Celtic Sea) and at Rockall. The primary—possibly only—species in Ireland is D. cf. flossada based mainly on the ICES International Bottom Trawl Survey and zoological specimens, the species off Norway is D. cf. intermedius (no confirmed records of D. cf. flossada, but it might occur), and based on limited data the main in the North Sea, Skagerrak and Kattegat is D. cf. intermedius (although at least one record of D. cf. flossada in this region, off west Sweden, has been reported). Uncertainty exists about the exact species involved in the southern half of the range, but a preliminary morphological study indicates that the one in the Azores is D. cf. intermedius.

References

External links
 
 

common skate
Endangered fish
Fish of the East Atlantic
Fish of the North Sea
common skate
common skate